The Social Christian Reformist Party (PRSC) is a Christian democratic right-wing political party in the Dominican Republic. It was established on July 24, 1984, by the union of Joaquín Balaguer's Partido Reformista and the Partido Revolucionario Social Cristiano. Some of the PRSC's founders and leaders were originally business leaders and Roman Catholics who opposed the communist, socialist, and social democratic tendencies of Juan Bosch, the Dominican Revolutionary Party (PRD) and the Dominican Liberation Party (PLD).

The PRSC is strongly associated with Balaguer, who was the presidential candidate of the PRSC and its predecessor party in all but one election between 1966 and 2000. The party was often in power during this period, but declined rapidly following Balaguer's death in 2002. After the mid-2000s the party was relegated to being a junior partner of the PRD or PLD, and ceased running a presidential candidate in 2012.

The PRSC was in an alliance with the People's Force party in the 2020 presidential elections, and won six seats in the senate and six in the chamber of deputies.

Background and formation

Long-time politician Joaquín Balaguer was the last figurehead president of Rafael Trujillo's dictatorship (1930–1961) in the Dominican Republic. Following Trujillo's assassination, Balaguer struggled to enact reforms and repair international relations while preventing the country from sliding into civil war between the communists and the trujillistas. Balaguer headed an internationally recognized caretaker Council of State in 1962 but resigned when the military opened fire upon demonstrators. A military coup d'état followed and Balaguer went into exile.

Juan Bosch became the first freely elected president in 1962, but was overthrown several months later in a military coup, and by 1965 the country fell into civil war. Balaguer created the Reformist Party and returned with the backing of the United States (which occupied the country) for the 1966 general election.

The Reformist Party's ideology and doctrine was largely undefined, following Balaguer's orders. Balaguer campaigned as a moderate conservative, advocating gradual reforms. The party remained in power through three presidential terms (1966–1978) known domestically as "The Twelve Years".

After falling from power in the 1978 elections, Balaguer sought to integrate christian democratic theory into the party, and consulted with the Venezuelan Social Christian Party. In 1985, the Reformists merged with the Social Christian Revolutionary Party (Partido Revolucionario Social Cristiano, PRSC), which had lost official party eligibility due to poor performance in the 1978 elections. The PRSC had been founded in 1962 by a group of exiles that included Alfonso Moreno Martinez, Mario Read Vittini, and Caonabo Javier Castillo.

History and policies

The new party was named the Social Christian Reformist Party (Partido Reformista Social Cristiano, also PRSC). It was dominated by Balaguer's personality and lacked a coherent strategy or philosophy other than his conservative tendencies.

The party won the presidency and both houses of Congress in 1986, and more modest victories in 1990 and 1994.

The PRSC declined rapidly following Balaguer's death in 2002. After the mid-2000s the party was relegated to being a junior partner of the Dominican Revolutionary Party (PRD) or the Dominican Liberation Party (PLD).

The party formed an alliance with the Modern Revolutionary Party, the Grand National Alliance and others for the 2006 elections, taking a distant third place. The party supported the Dominican Municipal League candidate in the 2008 presidential election, who came in a distant third place with less than 5% of the votes.

In the 2010 legislative elections, the party had a partial alliance with the PLD in almost all provinces and won 4 senators (3 within the alliance) and 8 deputies (5 within the alliance). The PRSC supported the PLD candidate in the 2012 presidential elections, which was the first time the party did not run its own candidate.

The party allied with the People's Force party in the 2020 elections.

The PRSC has attempted to reorganize itself with internal party discipline, reforming its management bodies, recruiting younger people, and attempting to expand its direct enrolment.  They have had strong internal struggles, but they have proven to be an organization that achieves consensus, integration and the unity of the members who follow internal party discipline.

List of party presidents
 Joaquín Balaguer (1963–2002)
 Quique Antún (2005–2009, 2014–present)
 Carlos Morales Troncoso (2009–2014)

Electoral history

Presidential elections

Congressional elections

References

External links
Official web site

Conservative parties in North America
Christian democratic parties in North America
Christian political parties
Political parties in the Dominican Republic
Political parties established in 1984